Hamed Fallahzadeh (born November 6, 1986) is an Iranian footballer who plays for Sanat Naft Abadan in the Persian Gulf Pro League.

Club career
Fallahzadeh started his career with Niroye Zamini. He joined Naft Tehran in summer 2009 and extend his contract in July 2012 for another year. He moved to Rah Ahan in summer 2013.

On 1 July 2014, Fallahzadeh left Rah Ahan and signed with Saipa.

Club career statistics

References

External links
 Hamed Fallahzadeh at PersianLeague.com

1986 births
Living people
People from Amol
Naft Tehran F.C. players
Rah Ahan players
Iranian footballers
Saipa F.C. players
Persian Gulf Pro League players
Azadegan League players
Association football goalkeepers
Sportspeople from Mazandaran province